Gundersen may refer to:
 Gundersen (surname), people with the surname Gundersen
 The Gundersen method, a method of competition in Nordic combined skiing devised by Gunder Gundersen
 Gundersen Lutheran Medical Center, a tertiary healthcare facility in La Crosse, Wisconsin
 the Gundersen flap, a surgical procedure developed by Trygve Gundersen

See also
 Gunderson (disambiguation)